John Bacon (1777–1859), also known as John Bacon the Younger, or Junior, to distinguish him from his equally famous father, was an English sculptor.

Biography

Bacon was the second son of the sculptor John Bacon and his wife Elizabeth Wade. He was born at his parents' home in Newman Street in the City of Westminster on 13 March 1777. He entered the Royal Academy Schools at the age of twelve, one of the youngest pupils ever admitted.

At fifteen, Bacon exhibited his first work; at sixteen, he was awarded the silver medal of the Royal Academy; and in 1797 he won the gold medal for his statue of Cassandra. His brother Thomas Bacon also exhibited at the Royal Academy between 1793 and 1795. Their father died in 1799, and the younger John Bacon succeeded to his business. He finished such works as he found in progress, including the well-known statue of Lord Cornwallis, and managed to secure ample patronage for himself. He ceased to exhibit at the academy in 1824.

Building projects included the figure of Providence on Trinity House in 1796 and replacing the figures of "Madness" and "Melancholy" over the entrance to Bethlem Hospital (better known as Bedlam) in 1814.

There are six of Bacon's monuments in St Paul's Cathedral and at least eight in Westminster Abbey. There are also two in Windsor Castle.

From 1818 until 1843, Bacon worked in partnership with his former pupil Samuel Manning, but their work appears to be largely by Manning, taking advantage of Bacon's reputation but, in the view of the art historian Rupert Gunnis, lacking the quality of Bacon's work. Bacon himself went into virtual retirement from 1830. He contributed articles on sculpture to Rees's Cyclopædia.

In 1801 he was married to Susanna Sophia Taylor (born 1782). He died in Bath, Somerset on 14 July 1859.

Selected public works

Other works
Bacon's notable works include:
Moses Striking the Rock (1792) RA
Bust of his father, John Bacon RA (1798)

 Monument to Edward Waldergrave, Church of St Thomas the Apostle, Navestock, Essex
Tomb of Dr William Heberden (1801) in Windsor Parish Church
Monument to Lord Rokeby, Armagh Cathedral, (1802)
Bust of William Markham, Archbishop of York (1804) in Christ Church, Oxford
Bust of Dr Maxwell Garthshore (1804) at RA
Monument to John Burland, Wells Cathedral, (1804)
Monuments, featuring carved military trophies and symbols, to John Yorke, died 1798, and Martin Yorke, died 1805, in the Church of St Mary the Virgin, Speldhurst Hill, Kent
Monument to Joseph Sykes, died 1805, Church of Saint Andrew, Kirk Ella, East Yorkshire
Monument to Francis Heneage, died 1807, in the Church of Saint Mary, Hainton, East Lindsey, Lincolnshire
Several monuments to members of the Langham family, who died between 1807 and 1812, in the Church of All Saints, Cottesbrooke, Northamptonshire
Monument to Sir William Bensley, Bletchingley, Surrey (1809)
Monument to General Giles Stibbert (1809) in South Stoneham
Memorial, a deep relief plaque, to Captain George Bryan, Westminster Abbey, (1809) 
Monument consisting of a panel and sculpture group, now separated, to General Coote Manningham, Westminster Abbey (1809) 
Monument to Thomas Drake Tyrwhitt-Drake (1809) in Amersham
Statues of Marquess Wellesley, Calcutta and Mumbai, (1809)
Monument to Dr John Littlehales MD, Winchester Cathedral, (1810)
Monument to Charles Lawson, Manchester Cathedral, (1810)
Monument to John Creighton, St. John's Anglican Church (Lunenburg), Nova Scotia, (1810)
Memorial, with medallion portrait, to Dr John Plenderleath, Westminster Abbey, (1811) 
Monument to General Crawfurd and General Henry MacKinnon, St Paul's Cathedral, (1812)
Statue of George III, Bank of Ireland (1813)
Monument to Admiral Sir William Rowley, Stoke-by-Nayland, Suffolk, (1813)
Monument to George Fraser, Canterbury Cathedral, (1813)
Tablet memorials to Thomas and Sophia Lambard, 1813, the Parish Church of Saint Peter and Saint Paul, Sevenoaks, Kent
Memorial to Sarah Mansfield, died 1813, Church of Saint James the Great, Birstall, Leicestershire
Monument to Sir Thomas Trigge, Westminster Abbey, (1814) 
Memorial, now lost, to Rev Dr Luttrell Wynne, Westminster Abbey cloisters (1814)
Monument to Baron Heathfield, died 1813, in the Church of Saint Andrew, Buckland Monachorum, Devon 
Monument to Sir Henry Sullivan (1814) in Thames Ditton
Monument to Henry Jodrell MP (1814) in Letheringsett
Memorial tablet to Mary Markham, Westminster Abbey cloisters, (1814) 
 Monuments to members of the Starkey family, who died between 1805 and 1815, in St Margaret's Church, Wrenbury, Cheshire
Monument to Sir Henry Strachey, 1st Baronet (1816) in Chew Magna
Monument to the Duchess of Chandos (1816) in Worlingworth
Wall monument to Sir John Sheffield and Rev. Robert Sheffield, 1816, Church of St Andrew, Burton upon Stather, Lincolnshire
Monument to Sir John Lombe (1817) in Bylaugh
Monuments to Lydia Buckley, died 1812, and John Buckley, died 1817, in the Brockhampton Chapel, Herefordshire
Monument to Bishop John Parsons, Balliol College, Oxford (1818)
Monument to Edward Madden, Chichester Cathedral, (1819)
Monument to Augusta Slade, Chester Cathedral, (1822)
Monument to Admiral Sir John Borlase Warren, Stratton Audley, Oxfordshire (1822)
Reredos of St Laurence's Church in Exeter (c.1835)
Tomb of his daughter aka Mrs Medley in St Thomas Church in Exeter (1842)
Wall memorial, with figure, to Rev. Thomas Robinson, Church of Saint Mary de Castro, Leicester Castle Yard
 A monument in the Church of Saint Mary, Churchgate, Stockport

With Samuel Manning
Memorial to Robert, Viscount Kilmorey (1818) at Adderley
Memorial to Walter, Marquess of Ormonde (1820) in Ulcombe
Memorial to Francis, Earl of Kilmorey (1824) at Adderley
Memorial to Sir John Walsh, 1st Baronet (1825) at Warfield

References

Attribution:

External links

1777 births
1859 deaths
English male sculptors
18th-century English male artists
19th-century English male artists
18th-century British sculptors
19th-century British sculptors
Sculptors from London